Leon Johnson Ladner (November 29, 1884 – April 12, 1978) was a Canadian lawyer and Conservative politician who represented Vancouver South in the House of Commons of Canada from 1921 to 1930.

He is the author of The Ladners of Ladner: by covered wagon to the welfare state, published in 1972 by Mitchell Press.

External links
 

Conservative Party of Canada (1867–1942) MPs
Members of the House of Commons of Canada from British Columbia
Lawyers in British Columbia
1978 deaths
1884 births